Damloup is a commune in the Meuse department in Grand Est in north-eastern France. It is in the arrondissement of Verdun.

World War I
Fort Vaux is partially within the boundaries of the commune (the other part is in the commune of Vaux-devant-Damloup). The Batterie de Damloup is located between Fort Vaux and the Laufée works (l'ouvrage D de la Laufée) which are both within the boundaries of the commune.

See also
Communes of the Meuse department

References

Communes of Meuse (department)